Craniops is an extinct genus of brachiopods in the family Craniopsidae with species known from the Ordovocian to the Devonian.

C. curvata, C. elegans, C. estona and C. obtusa are from the Kukruse Stage (Ordovician) of Kohtla-Järve, in north-eastern Estonia.

C. tenuis is a pooleville member of the Bromide Formation from the Middle and Upper Ordovician of Oklahoma.

See also 
 List of brachiopod genera

References

External links 

 
 
 Craniops at fossiilid.info

Prehistoric brachiopod genera
Paleozoic brachiopods
Craniopsida
Ordovician first appearances
Devonian extinctions
Paleozoic life of Ontario
Paleozoic life of Alberta
Paleozoic life of Quebec